The 2021 Durand Cup knockout stage began on 23 September with the quarter finals and ended on 3 October 2021 with the final at the Vivekananda Yuba Bharati Krirangan in Kolkata, West Bengal, to decide the champions of the 2021 Durand Cup. A total of 8 teams competed in the knockout phase.

Qualified teams 
The knockout stage involves the eight teams which qualified as winners and runners-up of each of the four groups in the group stage.

: Indian Super League club 
: I League club 
: 2nd Division League club 
: Indian Armed Forces team

Schedule 
The schedule was as follows.

Bracket

Quarter-finals

Summary

Matches

Semi-finals

Summary

Matches

Final

The final was played on 3 October 2021 at the Vivekananda Yuba Bharati Krirangan in Kolkata.

Notes

References 

2021 Durand Cup